Bank of St. Albans Building, also known as St. Albans City Building, is a historic bank building located at St. Albans, Kanawha County, West Virginia.  It was built in 1906, and is a three-story, masonry building in the Classical Revival style. The front facade features two sets of fluted columns with Ionic order capitals. It housed a bank until 1961, after which it was occupied by city offices.

It was listed on the National Register of Historic Places in 1988.

References

Bank buildings on the National Register of Historic Places in West Virginia
Commercial buildings completed in 1906
Buildings and structures in Kanawha County, West Virginia
Neoclassical architecture in West Virginia
National Register of Historic Places in Kanawha County, West Virginia
St. Albans, West Virginia
1906 establishments in West Virginia